Oliviero Diliberto (born 13 October 1956 in Cagliari) is an Italian politician. He has been leader of the Party of Italian Communists.

Early life 
Oliviero Diliberto was born in a family of public servants (his father Marco was employed as attorney in the Administration of the Region of Sardinia, his mother Lella was a teacher). His youth is scarred by the untimely death of his father in 1971, after which he had to be a fatherly role for his younger siblings: his sister Ludovica, then eight years old, and his brother Alessio, who was born just two months before.
Diliberto becomes involved with politics in 1969 at age 13, when he was in high school. It is a time of turmoil in Italian schools, and young Oliviero quickly rises through the ranks of the student movement during his University studies. He eventually becomes Secretary of the FGCI (Federation of Young Italian Communists, the youth organisation of the PCI) for the province of Cagliari in 1978, the same year of his graduation.

Fascinated by the philosophic thought of Michel Foucault, after graduating from high school he traveled for Paris where, to support himself, he briefly worked at the city morgue, preparing corpses that had to undergo autopsy.

From 1978 to 1986 he earns scholarships to further his law studies in Frankfurt and in Rome, then he works as researcher in the university of Cagliari, where later he will reach the post of Professor of Roman Law.

Political career
A former member of the Italian Communist Party, Diliberto joined the Communist Refoundation Party after the breakup of his former party.

First elected as MP in 1994 for the Communist Refoundation Party, Diliberto left his party in 1998 in contrast with the leadership's line about a motion of no confidence in which Romano Prodi was defeated. So Diliberto, together with Armando Cossutta and others, founded the Party of Italian Communists, of which he became the secretary. Diliberto then served as Minister of Justice in the first government of Massimo D'Alema, becoming one of the only two party members which were part of that government. He maintained the position until 2000, leaving voluntarily in the reshuffle, in order to concentrate on the party.

On taking office as Minister of Justice, he declared to the press his pride in being "The second Communist appointed as Minister of Justice after Palmiro Togliatti", and made a point of having the same desk previously used by the postwar Communist leader restored and placed in his office at the Ministry.

In November 2004 he was widely criticized for meeting with the leader of Hizbollah, Sheik Hassan Nasrallah, during a visit to Lebanon. This prompted a protest note to the Italian Government from the Israeli Ambassador in Rome.

Before the April 2006 general election held in Italy (and won by the centre-left coalition), he declared he would not serve as minister in case of a centre-left win, and instead he would maintain his place as party leader, and so he has.

In May 2006 he was elected to the City Council of Rome. He is currently professor of Roman Law at the Faculty of Law of the "La Sapienza" University of Rome.

Before the April 2008 snap general election (caused by the fall of the Prodi II Cabinet), Diliberto refused candidacy to the Camera dei Deputati in the Torino constituency for the left-wing alliance The Left – The Rainbow, which his party was participating to, on grounds of giving a chance to be elected to a junior party fellow - a steel worker in the local Thyssen-Krupp steelworks, where a fire on 6 December 2007 had killed seven colleagues.

After the disastrous results of both the 2008 general elections and of the 2009 European election, where the Italian left-wing parties failed to reach the minimum threshold, Diliberto has been confirmed as party secretary, with a mandate to pursue unity of the left wing parties.

Family 
Oliviero Diliberto has been married twice: in 1985 he married Ms. Delia Cardia, from which he separated after some years. He is currently married (since 1997) to Ms. Gabriella Serrenti with whom he met in 1978 at the university where he was assistant lecturer.

References

1956 births
Living people
People from Cagliari
Italian Communist Party politicians
20th-century Italian politicians
Communist Refoundation Party politicians
Party of Italian Communists politicians
Italian Ministers of Justice
Academic staff of the University of Cagliari
Academic staff of the Sapienza University of Rome